The 1990 Asian Games medal table is a list of nations ranked by the medals won by their athletes during the multi-sport event, being held in Beijing, China from September 22 to October 7, 1990. The National Olympic Committees are ranked by number of gold medals first, with number of silver then bronze medals acting as the rank decider in the event of equal standing. Other alternative methods of ranking include listing by total medals.

Medal table

References

 The Straits Times, 8 October 1990, Page 32
 Medal Table - Chinese Taipei Olympic Committee

Medal table
1990